Düzköy can refer to:

 Düzköy
 Düzköy, Borçka
 Düzköy, Düzce
 Düzköy, İspir
 Düzköy, Mengen
 Düzköy, Ulus